La Belle Histoire (1992) is a French film directed by Claude Lelouch, featuring Gérard Lanvin and Béatrice Dalle.

Synopsis
A film with emphasis on visuals and music, the plot concerns characters who meet in present time, mainly the male gypsy Jesus, and the female thief and con-artist Odona, who share parallel experiences from lives 2000 years in the past. These stories are juxtaposed.

Cast
 Gérard Lanvin : Jésus-Christ
 Béatrice Dalle : Odona
 Vincent Lindon : Simon Choulel
 Marie-Sophie L. : Marie
 Patrick Chesnais : Pierre Lhermitte
 Anémone : Madame Desjardins
 Isabelle Nanty : Isabelle
 Jean Benguigui : Doga
 Paul Préboist : The knit teacher
 Élie Chouraqui : Pierre's associate
 Amina Annabi : Jesus's sister
 François Perrot : Marie's uncle
 Jean-Michel Dupuis : Professor
 Gérard Darmon : The biker
 Amidou : The shepherd
 Pierre Vernier : The director
 Jean-Claude Dreyfus : The inspector
 Jacques Gamblin : The young cop
 Patrick Edlinger : Himself
 Patrice Laffont : Himself
 Marie Sara : Herself
 Hubert Reeves : Himself
 Laurent Weil : Himself

Events
Prior to the film's release, in February 1992 a 70 mm copy of the film was projected onto a 300 m wide screen mounted on the Palais des Congrès in Paris.

See also
 Cinema of France

References

External links

1992 films
French historical adventure films
1990s French-language films
Films directed by Claude Lelouch
Bullfighting films
Films scored by Francis Lai
1990s French films